There are several two-wheeled boards classifiable as inline boarding:
Dirtsurfing, two mountain bike style wheels and a brake
Freebord, two skateboard style wheels, plus another four for momentary stability